The Ready-To-Learn (RTL) Act is a project funded by PBS and the Corporation for Public Broadcasting (CPB) to supply educational programming and materials for preschool and elementary school children. Created in 1992, the Ready-To-Learn Act furthered the creation of the Ready-To-Learn programming block which provided eleven hours of educational programming throughout the day on the PBS channel. The goal of the initiative was to provide educational content to support low-income communities that addressed social and emotional development as well as emphasized language and cognitive skills for children ages 2-8 years old.

Requirements 

In order for a program to be included in the Ready-To-Learn (RTL) programming block, the program must have detailed curriculum goals that highlight either socio-emotional goals, academic goals, or both. The program creators must also provide a formative and summative research plan.

History

Inception 
In 1991, the then-president of The Carnegie Foundation for the Advancement of Teaching, Ernest Boyer, created a report titled "Ready To Learn: A Mandate for the Nation." In his report, he highlighted the decline in children's school readiness, encouraging an increase in educational materials and resources for pre-school age children.

1995–2005 
Beginning in 1995, the Ready-To-Learn grant, authorized by Congress, supported the creation of the programs Dragon Tales and Between the Lions. These new programs on PBS focused on facilitating literacy and social & emotional learning. PBS also started unveiling community and parent programs aimed at continuing a child's learning outside of the TV.

In 2004, the channel aired new educational programs Maya and Miguel and Postcards from Buster. These shows helped further the Ready-To-Learn initiative. Also during this time, PBS launched the organization's first website geared towards parents and the "From The Start" website for teachers.

2005–2015 
During this time the curriculum focus shifted to literacy. PBS debuted four new series to emphasize reading and literacy skills for young viewers: WordWorld, Martha Speaks, Super WHY!, and The Electric Company. As the digital landscape became more nuanced around the later 2000s, PBS adapted by creating new engagement activities beyond its television programs such as online games, magazines, and books. The effort also aimed to surround children in curriculum-rich content regardless of the medium they use. On a federal level, the Ready-To-Learn program begins ramping up its initiative on researching children's learning methods through media.

2013 and 2014 saw the addition of shows Peg + Cat and Odd Squad which focused on teaching math and literacy skills. Content expanded across platforms to make way for new digital and interactive technologies like mobile tablets and smart boards. The broadcast network focused on providing resources to teachers and parents that detailed how to best support a child's learning in the age of multimedia instruction.

2015–2020 
The Ready-To-Learn initiative switched its focus to personalization and community collaboration. The network launched shows such as Ready Jet Go!, The Ruff Ruffman Show, Elinor Wonders Why, Molly of Denali, The Cat in the Hat Knows a Lot About That! that focused on science inquiry and informational text. An emphasis is put on supplying RTL materials to under-resourced communities.

2020 and beyond 
Entering the 2020s, PBS has expressed its interest in focusing curriculum goals towards critical thinking, collaboration, functional literacy, and world of work knowledge and skills. The network also plans on expanding both its RTL television lineup as well as creating new short form video content and podcast episodes. Due to the impact of the pandemic, PBS also hopes to further support integrative learning that values at-home, community, and virtual learning.

Reception

Critical reception 
An article in the journal ScienceDirect in 2020 found that Ready-To-Learn programs boosted kids’ reading skills. Kids from low-income backgrounds were also seen making the greatest improvement. Cord Cutters News described PBS Kids Ready-To-Learn programs as ones that offer "great educational features and learning resources." Dana Anderson of Common Sense Media described the PBS Kids website to have a high educational value. She wrote, "Kids can practice a large variety of topics from letters, numbers, and logic to how to identify and talk about feelings."

Other networks' response 
Partly due to the positive response and impact of Ready-To-Learn, in 1994 Nickelodeon invested $60 million and six hours a day in Nick Jr. The channel within Nickelodeon would serve as a provider of educational programming for preschoolers.

Impact 
Through RTL, PBS stations have been able to work with local partners to provide research-driven content to low-income communities that support children's skill development.

Learning Neighborhoods 
Led by PBS stations and local contributors, Learning Neighborhoods are a model of community engagement that empower children's learning and foster caring environments. The main goal of Learning Neighborhoods is to expand the efforts of the RTL initiative into local communities across the country by providing access to learning resources. In 2019, new Learning Neighborhoods provided enhanced learning resources to communities in Pittsburgh PA, Austin TX, Detroit MI, New York NY, Madison WI, Anchorage AK, Las Vegas NV, Los Angeles CA, Birmingham AL, Tallahassee FL, Lexington KY, and Owings Mills MD.

References 

Public Broadcasting Service
Education in the United States